Lieutenant General Norbert Van Heyst (born 24 June 1944, in Rengsdorf) was a senior commander in the German Army.

In early 2003 he was appointed the commander of the International Security Assistance Force. On August 11, 2003, control of ISAF was handed to NATO with Van Heyst being replaced by Lieutenant General Götz Gliemeroth, also of Germany. Van Heyst retired on 1 July 2005.

References

 

Lieutenant generals of the German Army
Living people
Officers Crosses of the Order of Merit of the Federal Republic of Germany
1944 births
Military personnel from Rhineland-Palatinate
People from Neuwied (district)